The 1998 Kansas Jayhawks football team represented the University of Kansas in the 1998 NCAA Division I-A football season. They participated as members of the Big 12 Conference in the North Division. They were coached by head coach Terry Allen and assistant coach Mark Farley. Kansas played their home games at Memorial Stadium in Lawrence, Kansas.

Schedule

References

Kansas
Kansas Jayhawks football seasons
Kansas Jayhawks football